Mackenzie Glover (born February 18, 1998 in Winnipeg, Manitoba) is a Canadian swimmer competing in backstroke, freestyle and butterfly events and attends and competes at North Carolina State University.

Glover is the holder of several Manitoba provincial records and past holder of a Canadian Age Group 100 meter short course backstroke record. She has also represented Canada at many international events including the Youth Olympic Games, Junior Pan Pacific Swimming Championships and the FINA Swimming World Cup. She is also a two time finalist at the Canadian Olympic trials in 2016 in both the 100 and 200 backstroke events.

References

Canadian female backstroke swimmers
Canadian female freestyle swimmers
Canadian female medley swimmers
Swimmers from Winnipeg
1998 births
Living people
Swimmers at the 2014 Summer Youth Olympics
Swimmers at the 2019 Pan American Games
Pan American Games medalists in swimming
Pan American Games silver medalists for Canada
Pan American Games bronze medalists for Canada
Medalists at the 2019 Pan American Games